Eos is the goddess of the dawn in Greek mythology.

Eos or EOS may also refer to:

Astronomy
 221 Eos, an asteroid
 Eos Chasma, a depression on Mars
 Eos family, main-belt asteroids
 Earth Observing System, a NASA program

Literature
 Eos (imprint), an imprint of HarperCollins Publishing
 Eos (magazine), a weekly publication of the American Geophysical Union
 Eos Press, an American card games and role-playing game publisher

Music 
 Eos (album), a 1984 album by Terje Rypdal and David Darling
 "E.O.S.", a 2004 trance music piece by Ronski Speed
 "EOS", a 2017 song by Rostam from Half-Light

Places 
 Eos Glacier, a glacier in Antarctica
 Mount Eos, a mountain in Antarctica

Science
 Eos (bird), a genus of lories (parrots)
 Eos (protein), a photoactivatable fluorescent protein
 Eosinophil, a variety of white blood cell
 Esterified omega-hydroxyacyl-sphingosine, a human lipoxygenase
 Ethanolamine-O-sulfate, a chemical compound used in biochemical research
 European Optical Society
 IKZF4 or zinc finger protein Eos, a protein in humans
 Equation of state

Technology
 EOS (medical imaging), a medical projection radiography system
 EOS.IO, a cryptocurrency
 Canon EOS, a series of film and digital cameras
 Electrical overstress, a type of electronic component failure

Computing
 Cisco Eos, a software platform 
 EOS (operating system), a supercomputer operating system in the 1980s
 EOS (8-bit operating system), a homecomputer operating system in the 1980s
 EOS memory, ECC on SIMMs, used in server-class computers
 Emulator Operating System, an operating system used in E-mu Emulator musical instruments
 Extensible Operating System, Arista Networks's single-network operating system
 Ethernet over SDH, a set of protocols for carrying Ethernet traffic
 /e/ (operating system), a free and open-source Android-based mobile operating system

Transportation
 Eos (yacht), a yacht owned by Barry Diller
 Eos Airlines, a defunct airline
 Grif Eos, an Italian hang glider design
 Volkswagen Eos, a coupé convertible vehicle made by Volkswagen

Video games 
 E.O.S. or Earth Orbit Stations, a space station simulation by Electronic Arts
 Eos, a fictional world in Final Fantasy XV
 Eos, a fictional planet in Mass Effect: Andromeda
 Eos, a character in Red Faction
 Eos, a fictional planet in Star Wars: Starfighter
 Epic Online Services, an SDK for cross-platform play features

Other uses
 EOS (company), an American skin care company
 EOS Group, a financial services company
 End-of-sale
 Liwathon E.O.S.
 Norwegian Parliamentary Intelligence Oversight Committee or EOS Committee

People with the given name
 Eos Counsell (born 1976), Welsh violinist
 Gaynor Rowlands or Eos Gwalia (1883–1906), English actress
 Eos Morlais (1841–1892), Welsh tenor

See also
 Aeos (disambiguation)
 AOS (disambiguation)
 EO (disambiguation)
 OS (disambiguation)